Wallenia is a genus of flowering plants in the family Primulaceae endemic to the West Indies.

Species

Wallenia apiculata 
Wallenia aquifolia 
Wallenia bumelioides 
Wallenia calyptrata 
Wallenia clusioides 
Wallenia corymbosa 
Wallenia crassifolia 
Wallenia discolor 
Wallenia ekmanii 
Wallenia elliptica 
Wallenia erythrocarpa 
Wallenia fawcettii 
Wallenia formonensis 
Wallenia gracilis 
Wallenia hughsonii 
Wallenia ilicifolia 
Wallenia jacquinioides 
Wallenia lamarckiana 
Wallenia laurifolia 
Wallenia lepperi 
Wallenia maestrensis 
Wallenia punctulata 
Wallenia purdieana 
Wallenia subverticillata 
Wallenia sylvestris 
Wallenia urbaniana 
Wallenia venosa 
Wallenia xylosteoides 
Wallenia yunquensis

References

 
Primulaceae genera
Taxonomy articles created by Polbot